The District of Galicia was a World War II administrative unit of the General Government created by Nazi Germany on 1 August 1941 after the start of Operation Barbarossa, based loosely within the borders of the ancient Principality of Galicia. Initially, during the invasion of Poland by Germany and the Soviet Union, the territory temporarily fell under the Soviet occupation in 1939 as part of Soviet Ukraine.

Adolf Hitler formed a capital in Lemberg (Lviv) (Document No. 1997-PS of 17 July 1941), and the district existed from 1941 until 1944. It ceased to exist after the Soviet counter-offensive.

History
The District of Galicia comprised mainly the pre-war Lwów Voivodeship of the Second Polish Republic (today part of western Ukraine). The territory was taken over by Nazi Germany in 1941 after the attack on the USSR and incorporated into the General Government, governed by Gauleiter Hans Frank since the invasion of 1939. The region was taken over again by the Soviet Union in 1944.

The district area was managed by Frank's brother-in-law Karl Lasch (de, pl) from 1 August 1941 to 6 January 1942, and by SS Brigadeführer Dr. Otto Wächter from 6 January 1942 to September 1943. Wächter utilised the district capital Lemberg (pl: Lwów, ukr: Lviv) as a recruitment base for the 14th Waffen Grenadier Division of the SS Galicia (1st Ukrainian). In the course of the Holocaust in occupied Poland starting from the year of the invasion, the largest Jewish extermination ghettos were created in Lwów (Lemberg) and in Stanisławów (Stanislau).

Governors

See also
Administrative division of Polish territories during World War II
Soviet annexation of Western Ukraine, 1939–1940

References

History of Eastern Galicia
General Government
World War II occupied territories
Invasion of Poland
1941 establishments in Europe
1944 disestablishments in Europe
History of Lviv Oblast
History of Ternopil Oblast
History of Ivano-Frankivsk Oblast